Ebtekar refers to the Iranian politician Masoumeh Ebtekar. It may also refer to:

 Ebtekar (newspaper), Iranian newspaper
 Ala Ebtekar (born 1978), Iranian American artist